Holy Trinity Seminary is a Roman Catholic seminary residence in Irving, Texas, United States, in the Diocese of Dallas, Texas that is located within the University of Dallas campus, founded in 1964. It is headed by Rector Vincent Anyama, S.T.D. 

Seminarians at Holy Trinity Seminary attend classes at the University of Dallas. The University of Dallas is an independent Catholic university with strong ties to the Diocese of Dallas. As a non-degree-granting academic residence, Holy Trinity Seminary is not separately accredited by any accrediting organization, but is approved by the Diocese of Dallas and the Holy See for the formation of candidates for the priesthood prior to receiving the Sacrament of Holy Orders.

Academics
Before being ordained as a priest, seminarians who reside at Holy Trinity Seminary must graduate from the University of Dallas with a degree in Philosophy and Letters that is specifically designed for seminarians and their later priestly duties in managing a parish and attending to the spiritual needs of parishioners. Holy Trinity Seminary does not itself grant degrees, but rather serves as a residence for seminarians as they take classes at the neighboring academic campus of the University of Dallas.

In addition to their classroom studies at the University of Dallas, seminarians preparing for the priesthood at Holy Trinity Seminary are assigned house jobs and a weekly, communal work order so they learn to think of the seminary as their house and to accept responsibility for its maintenance.

Alleged involvement in sexual scandals

Starting in the 1970s Holy Trinity Seminary is accused to have ignored and lied about seminarians who were sexually abusive towards others, especially those who showed signs of homosexuality. One of the most infamous cases is of Rudolph (Rudy) Kos who entered the seminary at the age of 30 despite the fact that he had an abusive record from his previous marriage and having failed the psychological evaluation, and was later revealed to be a pathological liar and having sexually abused his two brothers growing up. Kos was eventually ordained for the Roman Catholic Diocese of Dallas in 1990 and has been accused of abusing multiple boys before he was removed from the ministry in 1992.

References

External links
Official academic-residence website
Official university website

Catholic seminaries in the United States
University of Dallas
Educational institutions established in 1964
1964 establishments in Texas
Roman Catholic Ecclesiastical Province of San Antonio